End of the Trail is a 1936 American Western film directed by Erle C. Kenton and starring Jack Holt, Louise Henry and Douglass Dumbrille.

Partial cast
 Jack Holt as Dale Brittenham  
 Louise Henry as Belle Pearson  
 Douglass Dumbrille as Bill Mason  
 Guinn 'Big Boy' Williams as Bob Hildreth  
 George MacKay as Ben Parker  
 Gene Morgan as Cheyenne  
 John McGuire as Larry Pearson  
 Edward LeSaint as Jim Watrous  
 Frank Shannon as Sheriff Anderson 
 Erle C. Kenton as Theodore Roosevelt

References

Bibliography
 Goble, Alan. The Complete Index to Literary Sources in Film. Walter de Gruyter, 1999.

External links
 

1936 films
1936 Western (genre) films
American Western (genre) films
Films directed by Erle C. Kenton
Columbia Pictures films
American black-and-white films
Films based on works by Zane Grey
Spanish–American War films
Cultural depictions of Theodore Roosevelt
1930s English-language films
1930s American films